Dadikh  is a Syrian village located in Saraqib Nahiyah in Idlib District, Idlib.  According to the Syria Central Bureau of Statistics (CBS), Dadikh had a population of 2674 in the 2004 census.

Syrian Civil War

Following the 'Dawn of Idlib 2' campaign, Dadikh became a part of the heavily contested Idlib frontline between Syrian military and Jihadist forces.

On 9 April 2022, two Syrian Army soldiers, including a captain, were killed in the village after HTS forces launched a sniping operation in the area.

On 11 December 2022, HTS militants launched an Inghimasi attack on a Syrian Army position on the outskirts of the village, killing at least 2 Syrian soldiers. The military position was blown up and destroyed during the attack.

References 

Populated places in Idlib District
Villages in Idlib Governorate